William Thomas "Bill" Petley (born 16 March 1935) is a former Australian professional rugby league footballer who played in the 1950s and 1960s. He played for Canterbury-Bankstown and Newtown in the New South Wales Rugby League (NSWRL) competition.

Playing career
Petley made his first grade debut for Canterbury against Manly-Warringah in Round 13 1956 at Brookvale Oval. At the end of the 1956 season, Petley joined Newtown but only managed to make one appearance for them before joining Canterbury-Bankstown once again in 1957. In 1958, Petley finished as Canterbury's top point scorer but the club did poorly on the field and only avoided the wooden spoon by finishing just above last placed Parramatta.

In 1960, Canterbury qualified reached the finals for the first time in many years and Petley played in the club's semi final defeat against Eastern Suburbs. Petley played with Canterbury until the end of 1963 before departing the club. Petley's final season saw him move to the wing as his fullback position was taken by an emerging Les Johns. In 1964, Petley represented NSW Country.

Petley played a total of 101 games for the club across all grades. In 2004, Petley was nominated for the Berries to Bulldogs 70 Year Team of Champions.

References

Year of death missing
Place of death missing
Place of birth missing
Australian rugby league players
Canterbury-Bankstown Bulldogs players
Newtown Jets players
Rugby league fullbacks
Rugby league wingers
Country New South Wales rugby league team players
1935 births